Gertrude Hendrina Maseko is a former member of the national assembly and the former First Lady of Malawi. 

Maseko originates from the village of Kapasule in Balaka District. She was educated at St Mary's Secondary School in Zomba. She was a member of the National Assembly for the DPP between 2009 and 2014, having been elected in the 2009 general elections. She married former President Peter Mutharika on 21 June 2014.

References

Living people
First ladies and gentlemen of Malawi
Democratic Progressive Party (Malawi) politicians
People from Balaka District
Malawian nurses
Members of the National Assembly (Malawi)
Year of birth missing (living people)